Mirella Pascual Jaurena (born April 10, 1954) is an Uruguayan actress.

Filmography

Film

Television

References

External links 
 

Uruguayan film actresses
Uruguayan television actresses
20th-century Uruguayan actresses
21st-century Uruguayan actresses
Uruguayan people of Basque descent
1954 births
Living people